Anaxita decorata, the decorated beauty, is a moth of the family Erebidae. It is found in Mexico and Central America.

References

Moths described in 1855
Phaegopterina
Moths of North America